Founded in 2004, the Indianapolis International Film Festival seeks to create a shared experience by championing films that entertain, challenge, and expand perspectives in Indianapolis and beyond. Indianapolis International Film Festival is also an Academy Award qualifying festival.

Combining premieres of international hits and American independents, the Indianapolis International Film Festival (Indy Film Fest) presents the largest variety of films in the city of Indianapolis.

2009 Awards
'Racing Dreams - Audience Award, Best FeatureWeathered - Audience Award, Best Short Film Sita Sings the Blues - American Spectrum, Best FeatureTrue Beauty This Night - American Spectrum, Best Short FilmA Ripple of Hope - Hoosier Lens Award, Best FeatureChicken Cowboy - Hoosier Lens Award, Best Short Frankie 13 vs The World - Best Documentary Short FilmBest Worst Movie - Best Documentary Feature Sinnerman - Black ExpressionsGone Fishing - World Cinema, Best Short FilmThe Vanished Empire - World Cinema, Best FeatureThe Way We Get By - Eric Parker Social Justice AwardLapsus - Excellence in AnimationFirst on the Moon - The Kurt Vonnegut, Jr. Prize for Outstanding Science Fiction Filmmaking

2008 AwardsMongol - Audience Award, Best FeatureTrying to Get Good: The Jazz Odyssey of Jack Sheldon - Audience Award, Best DocumentarySpider - Audience Award, Best Short FilmPop Skull - American Spectrum, Best FeatureBitch - American Spectrum, Best Short FilmDer Ostwind - American Spectrum, Special Jury Prize for Outstanding Technical achievement to Kohl GassBeyond Belief - Real Visions, Best Featurekids + money - Real Visions, Best Short FilmThe Life and Times of Robert F. Kennedy Starring Gary Cooper - Real Visions, Special Jury Prize for Outstanding Experimental Film to Aaron Valdez Cargo 200 - World Cinema, Best FeatureTen to Two - World Cinema, Best Short FilmBurn the Bridges - World Cinema, Special Jury Prize for Outstanding Performance to Irene AzuelaKarl Rove, I Love You - Hoosier Lens AwardLapsus - Excellence in AnimationFirst on the Moon - The Kurt Vonnegut, Jr. Prize for Outstanding Science Fiction Filmmaking

2007 AwardsSpeed Dating - Audience Award, Best Feature(Tie)Waitress - Audience Award, Best Feature (Tie)In the Shadow of the Moon - Audience Award, Best DocumentaryThe Substitute (Il Supplente) - Audience Award, Best Short FilmAdrift in Manhattan - American Spectrum, Best FeaturePop Foul - American Spectrum, Best Short FilmDisappearances - American Spectrum, Special Jury Prize for CinematographyNevel Is the Devil - American Spectrum, Special Jury Prize for ComedyKidney Thieves - American Spectrum, Special Jury Prize for ComedyRain in a Dry Land - Real Visions, Best FeatureAngel's Fire - Real Visions, Best Short FilmHeavy Metal Jr. - Real Visions, Special Jury Prize for DirectionMcLaren's Negatives - Real Visions, Special Jury Prize for Direction to Marie-Josee Sainte-PierreFraulein - World Cinema, Best FeatureEramos Pocos - World Cinema, Best Short FilmThicker Than Water - World Cinema, Special Jury Prize for Outstanding PerformanceMilk and Opium - World Cinema, Special jury Prie for Outstanding ScoreMarrying God - Hoosier Lens AwardEverything Will be OK - Excellence in AnimationFirst on the Moon - The Kurt Vonnegut, Jr. Prize for Outstanding Science Fiction Filmmaking

2006 AwardsA Place Called Home:  An Adoption Story - Audience Award, Best FeatureSugar Mountain - Audience Award, Best Short FilmEl Inmigrante - Grand Jury Prize, Best FeatureBinta & the Great Idea - Grand Jury Prize, Best Short Film
Antonio's Breakfast - Grand Jury Prize, Best European Short FilmKnocking - Audience Award, Best Non-Fiction FilmOver the Hedge - Audience Award, Best Family FilmKinky Boots - Audience Award, Best ComedyA Place Called Home:  An Adoption Story - Hoosier Lens Award for Best Indiana FilmBefore I Go - Special Jury Prize for Outstanding Performance to Heidy Forster and Horst SachtlebenLife in Transition - Special Jury Prize for Outstanding AnimationDirty Mary - Special Jury Prize for Achievement in Comedy to Daniele Ferraro for Writing, Producing, and ActingMonobloc - Special Jury Prize for Direction to Luis OrtegaDesire - Special Jury Prize - Honorable Mention for Documentary Filmmaking to Julie Gustafson & the New Orleans Teenage Girls Documentary ProjectBinta & the Great Idea - Markey's Humanitarian AwardApparition of the Eternal Church - Best North American Independent Feature Film

2005 AwardsMurderball - Audience Award, Best FeatureWest Bank Story - Audience Award, Best Short FilmMurderball - Audience Award, Best Non-Fiction FilmNOVEM - Grand Jury Prize, Best FeatureSolo un Cargador - Grand Jury Prize, Best Short Film (tie)Tama Tu - Grand Jury Prize, Best Short Film (tie)The Innocent - Grand Jury Prize, Best Non-Fiction FilmPearl Diver - Grand Jury Prize, Hoosier Lens Award for Best Indiana FilmTropical Malady - Special Jury Prize, Outstanding Direction to Apichatpong WeerasethakulNOVEM - Special Jury Prize, Outstanding Performance to the entire castBrothers - Special Jury Prize, Outstanding Performance to Connie Nielsen, Nikolaj Lie Kaas, and Ulrich Thomsen9 - Special Jury Prize, Outstanding Animation

2004 AwardsThe Story of the Weeping Camel - Audience Award, Best FeatureThe Climactic Death of Dark Ninja - Audience Award, Best Short Film (tie)Hairless - Audience Award, Best Short Film (tie)The Climactic Death of Dark Ninja - Grand Jury Prize, Best Short FilmBetween the White Lines - Grand Jury Prize, Best Feature FilmDogville - Special Jury Prize, Outstanding Performance to the entire castA Slipping Down Life - Outstanding Performance to Lily Taylor & Sara RueDisconcerting Symphony - Outstanding Performance to the entire castStuff That Bear! - Outstanding Cinematography to Oleg MutuEveryone and Their Mother Wants to Write and Direct'' - Outstanding Writing

Referência

External links
Indianapolis International Film Festival website

Film festivals in Indiana
Festivals in Indianapolis